The Daily was the world's first iPad-only (with Galaxy Tab 10.1 and Facebook support added later) news app in the United States and Australia, owned by News Corporation.

It was originally planned to launch The Daily in San Francisco on January 19, 2011; however, the launch was delayed by News Corporation and Apple. The Daily was launched on February 2, 2011 at the Solomon R. Guggenheim Museum in New York City.

The journal was placed "on watch" in July 2012 due to disappointing results. Despite reporting over 100,000 paying subscriptions, the journal was losing an estimated $30 million annually.

On December 3, 2012, News Corporation announced that The Daily would cease operations effective December 15 as part of a reorganization of News Corporation's assets. Its URL now redirects to the site of the New York Post.

News Corp CEO Rupert Murdoch said The Daily "could not find a large enough audience quickly enough to convince us the business model was sustainable in the long-term".

Scoop
The Daily is the first publication that made public the identity of Karen Kraushaar, a former employee of National Restaurant Association who filed accusation of sexual harassment against then CEO of the association and 2012 Republican presidential primaries candidate Herman Cain.

References

External links
Official website

American news websites
IOS software
News Corporation subsidiaries
Publications disestablished in 2012
Publications established in 2011